Class 230 may refer to:

British Rail Class 230
Vietnam Railways 230 Class